That Dangerous Age is a 1949 British romance film directed by Gregory Ratoff and starring Myrna Loy, Roger Livesey and Peggy Cummins. It was adapted from the play Autumn by Margaret Kennedy and Ilya Surguchev. The film was released under the alternative title of If This Be Sin in the United States. It was shot at Shepperton Studios and on location in London and Capri. The film's sets were designed by the art director Andrej Andrejew.

Plot
Sir Brian Brooke, a famous attorney, collapses while acting as defense counsel in a high-profile murder trial. Doctor Thorvald informs his (second) wife Cathy that Brian needs to rest for six months or he will die; Brian is also temporarily blind. They and Brian's daughter Monica relax in Italy.

They receive an anonymous letter accusing Cathy of carrying on an affair with Brian's junior partner, Michael Barcleigh. Brian's lawyer instincts makes him believe it, until Cathy reveals that Michael has confided to her that he is in love with Monica. Brian is apologetic, and delighted by the news. However, Cathy has lied, and the letter is correct.

Cast
 Myrna Loy as Lady Cathy Brooke
 Peggy Cummins as Monica Brooke
 Richard Greene as Michael Barcleigh
 Roger Livesey as Sir Brian Brooke
 Elizabeth Allan as Lady Sybil
 Gerard Heinz as Doctor Thorvald
 Jean Cadell as Nannie
 G. H. Mulcaster as Simmons
 Margaret Withers as May Drummond
 Ronald Adam as Prosecutor
 Wilfrid Hyde-White as Mr Potts
 Henry Caine as Mr Nyburg
 Patrick Waddington as Rosley
 Edith Sharpe as Angela Caine
 George Curzon as Selby
 Robert Atkins as George Drummond
 Phyllis Stanley as Jane
 Daphne Arthur as Margot
 Martin Case as John
 Barry Jones as Arnold Cane
 Louise Lord as Ellen
 Nicholas Bruce as Charles
 William Mervyn as Nicky
 André Morell as Doctor McCatcheon

Comic book adaption
 Eastern Color Movie Love #2 (April 1950)

References

External links

Review of film at Variety

1949 films
Adultery in films
1949 drama films
Films directed by Gregory Ratoff
British drama films
Films set in Italy
Films set in London
Films set on islands
Films set in the Mediterranean Sea
Films adapted into comics
Films about lawyers
British films based on plays
Films shot at Shepperton Studios
British black-and-white films
British romance films
1940s romance films
1940s English-language films
1940s British films